Generaal De Wet is a 76% green suburb of the city of Bloemfontein in South Africa.

References

Suburbs of Bloemfontein